Trophonopsis droueti is a species of sea snail, a marine gastropod mollusk in the family Muricidae, the murex snails or rock snails.

Description

Distribution
This marine species occurs in European waters.

References

External links
 Dautzenberg, P. (1889). Contribution à la faune malacologique des Iles Açores. Resultats des dragages effectués par le yacht l'Hirondelle pendant sa campagne scientifique de 1887. Révision des mollusques marins des Açores. Résultats des Campagnes Scientifiques Accomplies sur son Yacht par Albert Ier Prince Souverain de Monaco, I. Imprimerie de Monaco. 112 pp.; IV plates
 Dautzenberg, P. & Fischer, H. (1896). Dragages effectués par l'Hirondelle et par la Princesse Alice 1888-1895. 1. Mollusques Gastéropodes. Mémoires de la Société Zoologique de France. 9: 395-498, pl. 15-22
 Locard, A. (1897-1898). Expéditions scientifiques du Travailleur et du Talisman pendant les années 1880, 1881, 1882 et 1883. Mollusques testacés. Paris, Masson

Trophonopsis
Gastropods described in 1889